Neznámy pár is a duet by Marika Gombitová and Karel Gott released on OPUS in 1987.

The composition wrote Gombitová herself upon a request from František Polák, editor of the pre-filmed live show called Abeceda, created by ČST. Lyrics provided Kamil Peteraj, and the composition was presented on television on 1 November 1987. During the night show, both artists sung also "Hrajme píseň"), a trio recorded in collaboration with Czech actor Josef Laufer.

The duet itself was officially released on Gombitová's studio album entitled Ateliér duše (1987), and received a nomination for Zlatá nota, awarded by publicists of the Melodie magazine.

Later on, "Neznámy pár" was issued on Gott's compilation Zůstanu svůj: Hity z 80. let, which charted at number #9 on the Czech Top 50 albums chart in 2008.

Official versions
 "Neznámy pár" - Studio version, 1987

Credits and personnel
 Marika Gombitová - lead vocal, writer
 Karel Gott - lead vocal
 Vašo Patejdl - piano, keyboards, LinnDrum computer, chorus
 Kamil Peteraj - lyrics
 Juraj Burian - electric and acoustic guitar
 Andrej Šeban - electric guitar
 Michal Důžek - chorus
 Peter Penthor - chorus
 Trend band - chorus
 Štefan Danko - responsible editor
 Peter Smolinský - producer
 Juraj Filo - sound director
 Jozef Krajčovič - sound director
 Ivan Minárik - technical coordination

Awards

Melodie
Melodie was a modern music magazine (similarly to American Billboard) established in 1963 as a monthly periodical in Czechoslovakia. For the time of being, a bi-weekly rival entitled as Aktuality Melodie (also known as Áčko) was effective (1969–70). The magazine itself survived almost three decades, ceasing its operations in 1991. Apart from winning the Tip Melodie award as the Best Female Singer (1979), Gombitová and Gott scored with the 87's duet at number #7 (respectively at #8)A as Best Performer.

Notes
A The prize recognized as Zlatá nota (however, not to be confused with a different award of the same title) was shared with Gott, as a result of their common duet.

See also
 Hrajme píseň - trio with Karel Gott and Josef Laufer

References

General

Specific

External links 
 
 

1987 songs
Marika Gombitová songs
Songs written by Marika Gombitová
Songs written by Kamil Peteraj
Slovak-language songs